The International Rugby Players Women's Try of the Year was first presented in 2021. In similar fashion to the Men's Try of the Year, the try is voted on by the fans from four nominations that have been shortlisted by the IRP panel; The panel comprises Conrad Smith (NZL, Chair), Rachael Burford (ENG), Thierry Dusautoir (FRA), Fiao'o Fa'amausili (NZL), Bryan Habana (RSA) and Jamie Heaslip (IRE).

Winners & Nominees

References

External links
World Rugby Awards

World Rugby Awards